Last of the Summer Wine's twenty-second series aired on BBC One. All of the episodes were written by Roy Clarke and produced and directed by Alan J. W. Bell.

Outline

The trio in this series consisted of:

First appearances

Herman Teesdale (The Repo Man) (2001–2005, 2007–2010)
Toby Mulberry Smith (The Captain) (2001–2006, 2008–2010)

Last appearances

Mrs Avery (2000–2001)
Nora Batty (1973–2001, 2003–2008)

List of episodes

DVD release
The box set for series twenty two was released by Universal Playback in April 2012, mislabelled as a box set for series 23 & 24.

References

See also

Last of the Summer Wine series
2001 British television seasons